Most Holy Trinity Church or Church of the Most Holy Trinity may refer to:

Croatia 

 Church of the Most Holy Trinity, Sveta Nedelja

India 

 Holy Trinity Church, Powai, also called Most Holy Trinity Church

Italy 

 Santissima Trinità dei Pellegrini, Rome (Church of the Most Holy Trinity of the Pilgrims)

Portugal 

 Basilica of the Holy Trinity (Fátima), locally known as Church of the Most Holy Trinity

Slovakia 

 Most Holy Trinity Church, Tvrdošín

United States 

 Most Holy Trinity Church, Detroit, Michigan

 Church of the Most Holy Trinity, Veseli, Minnesota

 Most Holy Trinity Church, Mamaroneck, New York

See also 
 Holy Trinity Church (disambiguation)
 Trinity Church (disambiguation)